Sami Uotila (born 2 November 1976 in Helsinki) is a Finnish former alpine skier who competed in the 1998 Winter Olympics and 2002 Winter Olympics.

External links
 sports-reference.com
 

1976 births
Living people
Finnish male alpine skiers
Olympic alpine skiers of Finland
Alpine skiers at the 1998 Winter Olympics
Alpine skiers at the 2002 Winter Olympics
Sportspeople from Helsinki
21st-century Finnish people